The 2014–15 season was Leeds United A.F.C.'s fifth season in the second tier of English football. The season began in August 2014 and finished in May 2015.

Review
A summer that saw the departure of manager Brian McDermott in favour of the unheralded David Hockaday (whose only prior managerial experience was with Conference side Forest Green Rovers), as well as a host of players including club captain and top scorer Ross McCormack and dependable striker Matt Smith shipping out of Elland Road, saw Leeds listed as second-favourites for relegtion (ahead of only a Blackpool side who were somehow in even more turmoil both on the pitch and off it) among most bookmakers. Their start to the season did little to dispel these predictions, with Hockaday sacked the day after a humiliating League Cup exit to West Yorkshire rivals Bradford City, on top of losing three of his first four league matches in charge. Sporting journalists were quick to note that his six competitive matches in charge were two fewer than Brian Clough had managed during his infamous 44-day spell as manager.

Academy manager Neil Redfearn took over as caretaker manager and earned 10 points from the next four games, putting Leeds in mid-table, but was overlooked for the permanent manager's job in favour of another unexpected candidate, Slovenian manager Darko Milanič. Milanič failed to win any of his six games in charge, however, and was himself sacked 32 days later, exceeding both Clough's and Jock Stein's joint-record as the club's shortest-serving manager.

With Leeds right back in relegation trouble, they turned once again to Redfearn, and while they remained dangerously close to the foot of the table until well into the New Year, a strong run of form between late January and the end of March propelled them out of danger (as with the previous season, they were also helped by the poor form of all the bottom three clubs). However, the sudden suspension of Redfearn's assistant, Steve Thompson coincided with a poor end to the season and contributed to Redfearn's falling out with Cellino. After the season ended, Cellino first attempted to demote Redfearn back to his prior role as academy manager, then sacked him altogether, leaving Leeds looking for their sixth manager since the departure of Simon Grayson three years prior.

Events

This is a list of the significant events to occur at the club during the 2014–15 season, presented in chronological order, starting on 3 May 2014 and ending on the final day of the club's final match in the 2014–15 season. This list does not include transfers or new contracts, which are listed in the transfers section below, or match results, which are in the results section.

May
7 May: Former managing director David Haigh's company, Sport Capital issue a winding-up petition for a fee owed of around £1m.
30 May: Brian McDermott and Leeds United come to the mutual decision for the Leeds United manager to depart from his position.

June
10 June: The winding-up petition issued to Leeds by Sport Capital was adjourned but the case remained live and the club were ordered to pay back £958,000 by 23 June.
19 June: Dave Hockaday is appointed head coach of Leeds United, with Junior Lewis as his assistant coach.
23 June: The winding-up petition issued to Leeds by David Haigh's Sport Capital was dismissed by the High Court, resulting in the club's bank account being unfrozen.

July
1 July: Transfer embargo is lifted days after club's bank account is unfrozen

August
28 August: David Hockaday and Junior Lewis's contract as head coach and assistant coach are terminated with immediate effect, with Neil Redfearn taking over as caretaker head coach.

September
23 September: Darko Milanič announced as the new head coach after signing a two-year contract, with Neil Redfearn returning to his role of Academy manager and head of coaching, and Novica Nikčević joining as assistant coach.
26 September: Consultant Graham Bean is sacked over a fixture dispute, relating to the rearrangement of the home fixture vs. Reading.

October
25 October: The club part company with Darko Milanič, after failing to win in six games.

November
1 November: Academy manager Neil Redfearn is appointed as head coach on a one-year rolling contract, with the contract including the option to return to the club's Academy.
7 November: Leeds United have been served with a winding-up petition by law firm Ford & Warren Solicitors over unpaid fees of £150,000, that date back to when Ken Bates owned the club. The club issued a statement confirming the receiving of the winding-up petition. However, due to the illegal the winding-up order to the media within seven days of its service, the club's lawyers demanded that the petition be immediately withdrawn, and a full apology made else the club will ask the court to dismiss the petition on Monday morning.
12 November: The winding up petition presented by Melvyn Levi is dismissed on agreed terms.
27 November: Companies House confirm that David Haigh and Salah Nooruddin have resigned from Leeds United’s board – several months after the two men actually quit as directors. Salem Patel remains as a director and GFH revealed that Jinesh Patel, the CEO of Dubai-based GFH Capital, joined him on the Leeds’ board earlier this year.

December
1 December: The Football League disqualify Massimo Cellino from being a director of Leeds United Football Club until 18 March 2015.
4 December: Massimo Cellino and GFH Capital signed an agreement on 1 December to inject up to a further £20m of equity capital into the club.
12 December: Matt Child is appointed as the club's new Chief Operating Officer.
15 December: An initial analysis of the Championship Financial Fair Play for the Season 2013/14 Submissions indicated that Leeds United, Nottingham Forest and Blackburn Rovers failed to meet the Fair Play Requirement under the division’s Financial Fair Play rules. Consequently, all three were subject to an ‘FFP embargo’ under Football League regulations from 1 January 2015 for the remainder of the 2014/15 campaign.
18 December: Steve Thompson appointed assistant coach, arriving from Huddersfield Town.
22 December: Giuseppe Bellusci is charged by the FA for misconduct for a breach of FA Rule E3 for an incident alleged to have occurred during the fixture between Norwich City and Leeds United on 21 October 2014. It is alleged Bellusci used abusive and/or insulting words towards Cameron Jerome, of Norwich City, contrary to Rule E3(1). It is further alleged that this breach of Rule E3(1) is an "Aggravated Breach" as defined in Rule E3(2), as it included a reference to ethnic origin and/or colour and/or race. Bellusci has until 2 January 2014 to respond. there Due to there being no third party evidence supporting Jerome’s allegation, Bellusci will be contesting the charge.
23 December: The Football League and the legal representatives of Leeds United President Massimo Cellino have agreed the process and date of Mr. Cellino’s appeal against the decision by The Football League Board that he is subject to a disqualifying condition under its Owners’ and Directors’ Test, with it being heard by a Professional Conduct Committee chaired by Tim Kerr QC on 15 January. The original decision required Mr. Cellino to resign as a director of Leeds United and cease acting as a ‘relevant person’ in line with Football League regulations by 29 December. The League has agreed to defer that deadline until two days after the handing down of the final decision of the PCC. As a consequence, the parties have agreed that if Mr Cellino is unsuccessful in his appeal, any disqualification period will be extended by an amount equivalent to the length of time between 29 December and the deferred deadline.
31 December: Financier Andrew Umbers joins the board as a club director.

January
19 January: A Professional Conduct Committee (PCC) chaired by Tim Kerr QC rejected an appeal by Leeds United President Massimo Cellino against the  decision by the Board of The Football League that he is subject to a disqualifying condition under its Owners' and Directors' Test. The PCC found that the reasoned judgment of the Italian Court, once it had become available, was for an act involving dishonesty as determined by the Board in its original ruling in March 2014. As a result of this decision, Massimo Cellino is disqualified from acting as a ‘Relevant Person’, as defined by Football League regulations until 10 April 2015.
23 January: Massimo Cellino has resigned from his post at Leeds United, abiding by the Football League's ruling, with the plan of returning to his position in April. Board director Andrew Umbers is appointed interim Leeds United chairman in the absence of Massimo Cellino.

February
6 February: Giuseppe Bellusci is cleared of all charges of racism made against him during the away game against Norwich City on 21 October 2014, by  the FA disciplinary panel.
24 February: Club president Massimo Cellino announces he will not return to the club when his Football League ban ends in April in order to clear his name as an independent citizen. Cellino intends to appeal against the legality of his ban through arbitration with the FA (rule K).  Cellino also disclosed that he has sold a minority stake to an unnamed buyer in order to comply with his Football League ban.

March
5 March: The Football League, Leeds United and Massimo Cellino settled the outstanding disciplinary proceedings relating to the club's non disclosure of the Italian Court's judgement regarding Cellino as required under League regulations. As a result, Cellino's period of disqualification as a 'relevant person', as defined by the regulations, has been extended from 10 April until 3 May.
23 March: Matt Child resigns as Chief Operating Officer at Leeds United.

April
2 April: Director of Football, Nicola Salerno, suspends assistant coach Steve Thompson from his duties at the club, over an internal issue.
19 April: Lewis Cook crowned the Sky Bet Championship’s LFE Apprentice of the Year 2014/15.

Players

First team squad information

Appearances (starts and substitute appearances) and goals include those in the Championship (and playoffs), League One (and playoffs), FA Cup, League Cup and Football League Trophy.

Transfers

In

Loans in

Loans out

Out

New contracts

Pre-season
Pre season games against Guiseley and Chesterfield were confirmed by the club on 27 June.
A pre season game against Glenavon was confirmed by the club on 29 June. The Glevavon game forms part of the contract that saw Robbie McDaid sign for United in March. The club also confirmed a Leeds XI will face Corby Town.
Two pre season games in Italy were confirmed on 2 July, against local team FC Gherdëina and Romanian team FC Viitorul Constanța. However, the Viitorul Constanța was called off after the Romanian side failed to show up.
A pre season game against Swindon Town was confirmed on 7 July.
A pre season game against Mansfield Town was confirmed on 8 July, whilst the Glenavon game was confirmed as being for a Leeds XI.
The club confirmed a home game against Dundee United will complete the team's pre season schedule on 9 July.

Competitions

Overall summary

Championship

Results summary

Results by matchday

Championship
The fixtures for the 2014/15 season were revealed on 18 June 2014 at 9am.

FA Cup

The draw for the first round was made on 8 December 2014 at 7pm. Leeds United were drawn away to Sunderland. The date of the tie was confirmed on 12 December, with the game set for 4 January 2015.

League Cup

The draw for the first round was made on 17 June 2014 at 10am. Leeds United were drawn at home to Accrington Stanley. The date of the tie was confirmed on 30 June, with the game set for 12 August 2014.
The draw for the second round was made on 13 August 2014 after the final game of the first round. Leeds United were drawn away to Bradford City. The date of the tie was confirmed on 14 August, with the game set for 27 August 2014.

Awards

Internal Awards

Official Player of the Year Awards

The results of the 2014–15 Leeds United F.C. Player of the Year Awards were announced at a dinner on 2 May 2015 at Elland Road.

Fans' Player of the Year:  Alex Mowatt
Young Player of the Year: Lewis Cook
Players' Player of the Year: Alex Mowatt
Goal of the Season: Rodolph Austin (vs Watford, 28 February 2015)

References

Leeds United F.C. seasons
Leeds United
Foot